A telecompressor or focal reducer is an optical element used to reduce focal length, increase lens speed, and in some instances improve optical transfer function (OTF) performance. It is also widely known under the name “Speed Booster”, which is the commercial name of a line of telecompressors by the manufacturer Metabones. Popular applications include photography, videography, and astrophotography. In astrophotography, these qualities are most desirable when taking pictures of nearby large objects, such as nebulae. The effects and uses of the telecompressor are largely opposite to those of the teleconverter or Barlow lens. A combined system of a lens and a focal reducer has smaller back focus than the lens alone; this places restrictions on lenses and cameras that focal reducer might be used with.

Lens adapters that include telecompressors are useful with digital mirrorless cameras.  By combining a telecompressor within a lens adapter, mirrorless cameras can use the lenses of both digital single-lens reflex cameras (DSLRs) and film-based SLR (Single-lens reflex cameras).

Calculating focal reduction 
For a refractor telescope or simple camera lens, the new effective focal length fn is given by:

 

where
fo = original focal length of telescope,
d = distance from telecompressor to image plane, and
fr = focal length of telecompressor.

For a reflecting telescope, the calculation is the same.  However, since the telecompressor increases the field of view, there could be vignetting in the image, depending on the sizes of the secondary mirror and the telescope tube.

For a catadioptric system that has a combination of mirror and lens, the determination of reduction is more complicated, due to the fact that the telescope has a variable focal length, where the imaging plane can move along the axis of the imaging system.  As the addition of the telecompressor will increase the necessary back focus, the original focal length will increase by a certain amount, and then this new focal length would be used in the above formula.

Keplerian (relay) telecompressors 
Telecompressors were used in early digital SLR systems like the Minolta RD-175 and the Nikon E series. The technology of the time used relatively small sensor sizes, so lenses designed for 35 mm film could not be used with their native field of view without additional optics used. Implementing a telecompressor helped to mitigate these limitations. One effect of a telecompressor is that it reduces the diameter of the image circle, which means that a lens meant for a larger format can be used on a smaller sensor with a higher crop factor.

See also
Barlow lens
Teleconverter
Convertible lens

References

Astronomical instruments
Photography equipment